Jeremy Lomibao Sancebuche (born November 11, 1996), also known as Mimiyuuuh or Mimi, is a Filipino vlogger and YouTuber. Sancebuche initially gained popularity after posting a video lip syncing to the song "Dalagang Pilipina" by ALLMO$T, which was part of a viral video challenge. The video went viral and motivated the creation of own versions of many local celebrities.

Early life 
Sancebuche was raised in Baclaran, Parañaque, just south of Manila, Philippines; Mimiyuuuh's parents sold clothes in the said area. Mimiyuuuh attended De La Salle–College of Saint Benilde in Manila, taking up a bachelor's degree in Fashion Design and Merchandising, and also worked as a student assistant in the aforementioned school.

Career 
Mimiyuuuh initially made mukbang videos on YouTube before becoming popular in 2019, after participating in the "Dalagang Pilipina" online challenge. After going viral, Mimiyuuuh's YouTube channel would surpass one million subscribers in just six months. Outside of YouTube, Mimiyuuuh has appeared in several TV shows in the Philippines. Mimiyuuuh later became a host at the ABS-CBN Ball in 2019, interviewing artists on the red carpet. That same year, Mimiyuuuh would claim their first award as a vlogger at the E! Pop Gala. Mimiyuuuh is the second Filipino celebrity to have their voice featured on the Waze app, and later appeared in a Pepsi Philippines TV commercial. Currently, Mimiyuuuh is a brand ambassador for Lazada in the Philippines.

Mimiyuuuh owns the clothing brand Fangs, a contemporary street style brand that aims to empower women through unconventional and ragged clothing, featuring Mimiyuuuh's own designs. Mimiyuuuh has collaborated with celebrity vloggers like Alex Gonzaga, Rufa Mae Quinto, Moira Dela Torre, Erich Gonzales, The Gold Squad (Seth Fedelin, Andrea Brillantes, Francine Diaz, Kyle Echarri), Heart Evangelista, Sarah Geronimo, Pia Wurtzbach and Bea Alonzo. Mimiyuuuh had also created traditional and graphic art. In November 2019, Mimi worked as a commercial model for the Italian luxury brand, Off-White after featuring the brand in one of their vlogs with Alex Gonzaga along with her photoshoot with a local fashion magazine, Preview.

On March 27, 2020, Mimiyuuuh hosted an online zumba session to help raise funds for charity; the funds would be donated to Caritas Manila and Save San Roque.

A video of Mimiyuuuh dancing to Gagong Rapper's song "Kabet" was published on the video-sharing platform TikTok on August 21, 2020; the internet sensation went viral again after posting the dance video. The viral video was part of the "It really hurts" challenge.

On September 25, 2020, independent record label O / C Records revealed that internet superstar Mimiyuuuh will be joining its roster of talents. The Kean Cipriano-led record label invited Mimiyuuuh to the business on social media. Six days later, on October 1, 2020, Mimiyuuuh released their debut single "DYWB (Drink Your Water Bitch)" under O/C Records.

Personal life 
Mimiyuuuh has since bought a house for their family due to their popularity. A tour vlog of the new house was published on YouTube on October 27, 2020. In a vlog posted in May 2021, Mimiyuuuh revealed that their parents suffered from COVID-19.

Discography 
2020: DYWB (Drink Your Water Bitch)

Filmography

Television

Film

Accolades

References

External links 

 

1996 births
Living people
Filipino YouTubers
LGBT YouTubers
People from Parañaque
YouTube vloggers
20th-century LGBT people
21st-century LGBT people